"" is a song by Lebanese-born British singer and songwriter Mika, released as a single in France ahead of the release of his third studio album, The Origin of Love. 
Mika re-recorded the song in English under the title "Emily". "Emily" is included on the standard track listing of The Origin of Love, while "" is featured as a bonus track on the French standard edition of the album, and all international deluxe editions. The song was released on 11 July 2011.

Background
The song was first rumoured when a twelve-second preview was published online on 1 July 2011. Just ten days later, the French iTunes Store made the whole song available as a digital download. However, its official release did not occur until 26 September 2011.
Lyrically, the song is "about all the horrific things a mother can say to her son to get him to get out of her house".

A first English version named "She tells me" was sung live, with lyrics very close to the initial meaning. The commercially released version switched the focus to an Emily character with the singer being the one bossing her around.

Music video

The music video directed by Kinga Burza was released on 16 August 2011. The video shows a family dancing and singing along to the song individually, as well as clips of the family members arguing and behaving mischievously. The video features a well-known ensemble of French actors, including Fanny Ardant, Marie-Clotilde Ramos-Ibanez, Patrice Pujol and Axel Huet.

In Other Media
The song "Elle Me Dit" is featured in the 2017 film "Pitch Perfect 3".

Track listing

Chart performance

Year-end charts

Certifications

Release history

References

External links
 Mika's official website
 

2011 singles
2011 songs
Mika (singer) songs
Songs written by Mika (singer)
French-language songs
SNEP Top Singles number-one singles
Ultratop 50 Singles (Wallonia) number-one singles